Aliabad Piameni (also Romanized as ‘Ālīābād Pīāmenī; also known as ‘Ālīābād) is a village in Azna Rural District, in the Central District of Khorramabad County, Lorestan Province, Iran. At the 2006 census, its population was 68, in 16 families.

References 

Towns and villages in Khorramabad County